Ba Vì or Ba Vi may refer to:

Ba Vì District
Ba Vì mountain range
Ba Vì National Park